The Serra do Ororubá, also known as the Serra do Urubá or Serra do Arorobá, is a mountain range in Pesqueira, Pernambuco, Brazil. It is the traditional territory of the Xukuru people.

Various Xukuruan languages were spoken in the mountain range.

References

External links
Xukurú do Ororubá

Ororubá
Landforms of Pernambuco